Ambush Entertainment is a Los Angeles based, artist driven, independent film production company that, with its financing arm Cold Iron Pictures, is dedicated to producing provocative, diverse, and original feature films, television and web content aimed at appealing to a wide audience.

List of Ambush Entertainment Films

Upcoming Projects 
2012 looks to be a busy year for Ambush Entertainment.  They signed on to produce the adaptation of  Martha O' Connor's novel "The Bitch Posse" to be directed by Catherine Hardwicke who also directed "Twilight" and "Red Riding Hood" among others.  Also on tap is the sci-fi thriller "Below The Surface" based on a John Kelly script and to be directed by "The Eye" and "Them" director Xavier Palud 
Other Projects slated for 2012 include:
 Spinning Plates - Spinning Plates is a feature documentary film about three restaurants, extraordinary for what they are today as well as the challenges they have overcome.
 Labor of Love - Labor of Love tells the story of Susan Austin and Lance Gilman who run the world famous Mustang Ranch brothel.  With Susan's smarts and Lance's savvy, they are redefining what a brothel can be. From sponsored athletes and live events to concerts, motocross competitions, MMA fights, and unique Mustang Games, they're charting a new course.

References

Film production companies of the United States
American independent film studios